Rico "Juice" Tan (born February 26, 1978 in Toronto, Ontario) was a Canadian welterweight boxer of Chinese Indonesian descent from 2000-2003. Tan retired with a 12-2-2 (11 ko's) professional boxing record. Tan now owns a Hawaiian BBQ food cart and catering company named "Liko's Hawaiian Barbecue".

References
 

1978 births
Living people
Canadian male boxers
Welterweight boxers
Boxers from Toronto
Canadian sportspeople of Chinese descent
Canadian sportspeople of Indonesian descent